White Rock (variant name: Whiterock) is an unincorporated community in Madison County, North Carolina, United States.  The community is located along Chapel Hill Road (SR 1316), which connects to nearby NC 212.  The community is part of the Asheville Metropolitan Statistical Area.

References

Unincorporated communities in Madison County, North Carolina
Unincorporated communities in North Carolina